Ligabue is a family name of Italian origin, and may refer to:

Antonio Ligabue (1899-1965), Italian naïve painter
Giancarlo Ligabue (1931-2015), Italian palaeontologist, politician and businessman
Ilva Ligabue (1932-1998), Italian operatic soprano
Luciano Ligabue (born 1960), Italian singer, songwriter, book writer and film director
Ligabuesaurus, an extinct reptile named in honor of Giancarlo Ligabue

See also
 Ligabue (film), a 1978 film

Italian-language surnames